Hexestrol dipropionate (brand name Hexanoestrol, Retalon Oleosum), or hexestrol dipropanoate, is a synthetic, nonsteroidal estrogen of the stilbestrol group related to diethylstilbestrol. It is an ester of hexestrol, and has been known since at least 1931. The drug has been used in the past to inhibit lactation in women.

See also
 Hexestrol diacetate
 Hexestrol dicaprylate
 Hexestrol diphosphate

References

Abandoned drugs
Estrogen esters
Propionate esters
Stilbenoids
Synthetic estrogens